Bhivargi Dam, is an earthfill dam on Patan river near Jat, Sangli district in state of Maharashtra in India.

Specifications

Purpose
 Irrigation

See also
 Dams in Maharashtra
 List of reservoirs and dams in India

References

Dams in Sangli district
Dams completed in 2001
2001 establishments in Maharashtra